Seaton is a village and civil parish in the East Riding of Yorkshire, England.

The civil parish consists of the village of Seaton and the hamlets of Catfoss and Wassand. According to the 2011 UK census, Seaton parish had a population of 433, an increase on the 2001 UK census figure of 409.

References

External links

Villages in the East Riding of Yorkshire
Civil parishes in the East Riding of Yorkshire
Holderness